Awaous melanocephalus, the largesnout goby, is a species of goby that is native to fresh water rivers and streams of India, Sri Lanka, Ryukyu Islands, China, Taiwan, Vietnam, Thailand, Philippines, Indonesia, Papua New Guinea and Solomon Islands. Some suggestions has been recorded from Fiji islands and Mauritius, but not confirmed yet.  
 
Adults inhabit in freshwater streams with clear waters, and some muddy bottoms.

References

 https://www.researchgate.net/publication/226242902_Eggs_and_larvae_of_Awaous_melanocephalus_(Teleostei_Gobiidae)

melanocephalus
Freshwater fish of Papua New Guinea
Freshwater fish of India
Freshwater fish of Sri Lanka
Fish described in 1849
Taxobox binomials not recognized by IUCN